Tasman Shields (20 November 1872 – 28 August 1950) was an Australian politician.

He was born in Launceston. In 1915 he was elected to the Tasmanian Legislative Council as an independent member for Launceston. He held the seat until 1936, when he was defeated. Shields died in Launceston in 1950.

References

1872 births
1950 deaths
Independent members of the Parliament of Tasmania
Members of the Tasmanian Legislative Council